Maxim Sergeyevich Malyutin (born  16 September 1988 in Yaroslavl, Russian SFSR, Soviet Union) is a Belarusian professional ice hockey goaltender. He currently plays for Yunost Minsk of the Belarusian Extraliga. Malyutin was selected for the Belarus national men's ice hockey team in the 2010 Winter Olympics.

External links
 

1988 births
Living people
Belarusian ice hockey goaltenders
HK Vitebsk players
Ice hockey players at the 2010 Winter Olympics
Olympic ice hockey players of Belarus
Sportspeople from Yaroslavl
Yunost Minsk players